Albert Thomas James (5 June 1923 – 4 December 1992) was an Australian rules footballer who played for the Richmond Football Club in the Victorian Football League (VFL).

Notes

External links 
		

1923 births
Australian rules footballers from Victoria (Australia)
Richmond Football Club players
1992 deaths